Jürgen Stoffregen (born 10 March 1957) is a retired German football striker and later manager.

References

1957 births
Living people
German footballers
TSV Havelse players
Hannover 96 players
Association football midfielders
2. Bundesliga players
German football managers
TSV Havelse managers
Hannover 96 managers
Sportspeople from Hildesheim
Footballers from Lower Saxony